Lee Jae-yong is a South Korean businessman.

 Lee Jae-yong (actor) (born 1963), South Korean actor
 E J-yong (born 1966), South Korean film director